The 1993 New York Mets season was the 32nd season in the history of the franchise. The team sought to improve on its 72-90 mark from 1992. Instead, the Mets slid back and for the first time since 1967 lost 100 games. The Mets finished with a 59-103 record, their fifth worst in history, and finished in last place in the NL East. They played all of their home games at Shea Stadium. As of 2022, this was the most recent 100-loss season for the Mets.

Background
The 1993 Mets entered the season after a disappointing 1992 campaign where their major player acquisitions, designed to help the team return to contending for a division title, largely fizzled out. Their biggest acquisition, outfielder Bobby Bonilla, did not perform up to fans' expectations and was frequently booed by the local fans. Pitcher Bret Saberhagen and second baseman Willie Randolph, two more major pickups in the previous offseason, were injured much of the season and largely ineffective. One of the few bright spots was Eddie Murray, who led the team with 91 RBI to go along with 16 home runs, but besides he and Bonilla (74 RBI, 19 home runs) no Met reached 50 RBI or 15 home runs. Murray's .261 average led the regulars, who all struggled to record hits; shortstop Dick Schofield, for instance, recorded over 400 plate appearances but could not manage to reach 100 hits. Howard Johnson, the 1991 National League home run and RBI champion, also battled injuries and saw his totals fall off significantly. The pitching staff was not much better off, as Dwight Gooden recorded his worst season as a major leaguer and the team left a hole in its rotation by trading away ace David Cone in August; Gooden's 12 wins led the team.

Manager Jeff Torborg, who had come off two consecutive winning seasons with the Chicago White Sox, found himself unable to maintain control of the team. He had a particularly testy relationship with outfielder Vince Coleman, which eventually resulted in the former stolen base king's suspension in September.

Offseason
The Mets were not as aggressive in pursuing other players as they had been in 1992 but made a splash in a trade, acquiring All-Star shortstop Tony Fernández in a trade with the San Diego Padres. Another significant acquisition was veteran starter Frank Tanana, who had spent the last eight years with the Detroit Tigers and would give the rotation an additional veteran to go with Gooden, Fernandez, and Saberhagen.

Moves

 October 26, 1992: Wally Whitehurst, D. J. Dozier and a player to be named later were traded by the Mets to the San Diego Padres for Tony Fernández. The Mets completed the deal by sending Raul Casanova to the Padres on December 7.
 November 17, 1992: José Martínez was drafted from the Mets by the Florida Marlins in the 1992 Major League Baseball expansion draft.
 December 2, 1992: Roger Mason was signed as a free agent by the Mets.
 December 17, 1992: Roger Mason and Mike Freitas (minors) were traded by the Mets to the San Diego Padres for Mike Maddux.
 December 22, 1992: Mauro Gozzo was signed as a free agent with the New York Mets.
 December 28, 1992: Eric Bullock was signed as a free agent by the Mets.

Regular season
Once again, trouble courted the Mets in 1993. After Bob Klapisch and John Harper's chronicle of the 1992 season, The Worst Team Money Could Buy, came out early in the season, Bobby Bonilla confronted Klapisch after a game and tried to provoke him into a physical confrontation. In June, Bret Saberhagen filled a Super Soaker water gun with bleach and shot it at reporters in the clubhouse. Vince Coleman once again found himself in trouble when he struck Dwight Gooden with a golf club while swinging it wildly in the clubhouse and injured him. Later in the season, while in the car of Los Angeles Dodgers outfielder Eric Davis, Coleman tossed a lit firecracker toward a crowd of autograph seekers at Dodger Stadium, injuring three people when it exploded. This proved to be the last straw for the Mets and Coleman; he was placed on administrative leave following the incident and the team later announced that Coleman would not be with the team going forward.

After thirty-eight games, the Mets had decided enough was enough and relieved Jeff Torborg of his duties as manager. He became the third straight Mets skipper to be fired before the end of the season, following Davey Johnson and Bud Harrelson. The team then called upon Dallas Green, who had been out of baseball since he was fired by the New York Yankees as their manager during the 1989 season. With the team standing at 13-25, Green recorded only forty-six victories in his abbreviated first campaign and brought the Mets home with the worst record in baseball. The team's poor record also cost second year general manager Al Harazin his job, with the team hiring San Diego Padres general manager Joe McIlvaine to replace him.

Despite the poor record, some positives came from the Mets' lineup. Bonilla returned to the All-Star Game and hit a career high 34 home runs. Second baseman Jeff Kent, in his first full year as a starter, added 21 home runs with 80 RBI. Eddie Murray tallied 27 home runs, led the team with a .285 average, and recorded 100 RBI, the first time he had done that since he was with the Baltimore Orioles in 1985. 1993 also saw the debut of Bobby Jones, a rookie who would become a frontline starter for the Mets in the coming years.

Anthony Young
One of the stranger stories of the 1993 season was the losing streak recorded by pitcher Anthony Young. After winning his first two decisions of the 1992 season, Young would lose his final fourteen of the year. He picked up right where he left off in 1993, dropping thirteen straight games were he factored into the decision and breaking a record that was held by Boston Braves pitcher Cliff Curtis, who lost 23 straight decisions over the course of the 1910 and 1911 seasons.

Young's losing streak was snapped at 27 on July 28 against the expansion Florida Marlins. Young allowed an unearned run in the top of the ninth to give the Marlins a 4-3 lead. The Mets scored two runs in the bottom of the ninth against closer Bryan Harvey to win the game 5-4. The win was the only one Young recorded in 1993, 
and he went on to finish with a team high sixteen losses in thirty-nine appearances with ten starts.

Season standings

Record vs. opponents

Opening Day starters
Bobby Bonilla
Vince Coleman
Tony Fernández
Dwight Gooden
Todd Hundley
Howard Johnson
Jeff Kent
Eddie Murray
Joe Orsulak

Notable transactions
 April 23, 1993: Jeff Kaiser was selected off waivers by the Mets from the Cincinnati Reds.
 May 14, 1993: Ced Landrum was signed as a free agent by the Mets.
 June 11, 1993: Tony Fernández was traded by the Mets to the Toronto Blue Jays for Darrin Jackson.
 June 12, 1993: Wayne Housie was traded by the Mets to the Milwaukee Brewers for Josías Manzanillo.

Roster

Game log

Regular season 

|- style="background:#cfc;"
| 1 || April 5 || Rockies || 3–0 || || || – || Shea Stadium || 1–0
|- style="background:#cfc;"
| 2 || April 7 || Rockies || 6–1 || || || – || Shea Stadium || 2–0
|- style="background:#fbb;"
| 3 || April 9 || Astros || 3–7  || || || – || Shea Stadium || 2–1
|- style="background:#fbb;"
| 4 || April 10 || Astros || 3–6 || || || – || Shea Stadium || 2–2
|- style="background:#fbb;"
| 5 || April 11 || Astros || 4–5 || || || || Shea Stadium || 2–3
|- style="background:#bbb;"
| — || April 12 || @ Rockies || colspan=7 | Postponed (rain) Makeup: Apr 12
|- style="background:#cfc;"
| 6 || April 13 || @ Rockies || 8–4 || || || – || Mile High Stadium || 3–3
|- style="background:#cfc;"
| 7 || April 14 || @ Rockies || 6–3 || || || || Mile High Stadium || 4–3
|- style="background:#fbb;"
| 8 || April 15 || @ Rockies || 3–5 || || || – || Mile High Stadium || 4–4
|- style="background:#cfc;"
| 9 || April 16 || @ Reds || 3–1 || || || || Riverfront Stadium || 5–4
|- style="background:#cfc;"
| 10 || April 17 || @ Reds || 4–1 || || || || Riverfront Stadium || 6–4
|- style="background:#fbb;"
| 11 || April 18 || @ Reds || 2–3 || || || || Riverfront Stadium || 6–5
|-

|- style="background:#fbb;"
| 45 || May 28 || Reds || 2–5  || || || || Shea Stadium || 15–30
|- style="background:#cfc;"
| 46 || May 29 || Reds || 4–3 || || || || Shea Stadium || 16–30
|- style="background:#fbb;"
| 47 || May 30 || Reds || 4–8 || || || – || Shea Stadium || 16–31
|-

|- style="background:#fbb;"
| 51 || June 4 || @ Astros || 2–7 || || || – || Astrodome || 18–33
|- style="background:#fbb;"
| 52 || June 5 || @ Astros || 5–7 || || || || Astrodome || 18–34
|- style="background:#fbb;"
| 53 || June 6 || @ Astros || 4–5 || || || || Astrodome || 18–35
|-

|-

|- style="background:#cfc;"
| 118 || August 16 || @ Reds || 6–2 || || || || Riverfront Stadium || 41–77
|- style="background:#fbb;"
| 119 || August 17 || @ Reds || 0–6 || || || – || Riverfront Stadium || 41–78
|- style="background:#cfc;"
| 120 || August 18 || @ Reds || 12–2 || || || – || Riverfront Stadium || 42–78
|- style="background:#bbb;"
| — || August 20 || @ Rockies || colspan=7 | Postponed (rain) Makeup: Aug 21
|- style="background:#fbb;"
| 121 || August 21 || @ Rockies || 3–4 || || || || Mile High Stadium || 42–79
|- style="background:#fbb;"
| 122 || August 21 || @ Rockies || 6–8 || || || || Mile High Stadium || 42–80
|- style="background:#fbb;"
| 123 || August 22 || @ Rockies || 3–4 || || || || Mile High Stadium || 42–81
|- style="background:#fbb;"
| 124 || August 23 || Reds || 2–6 || || || – || Shea Stadium || 42–82
|- style="background:#cfc;"
| 125 || August 24 || Reds || 5–4 || || || – || Shea Stadium || 43–82
|- style="background:#fbb;"
| 126 || August 25 || Reds || 1–4 || || || – || Shea Stadium || 43–83
|- style="background:#cfc;"
| 127 || August 26 || Rockies || 7–1 || || || – || Shea Stadium || 44–83
|- style="background:#cfc;"
| 128 || August 27 || Rockies || 3–2 || || || || Shea Stadium || 45–83
|- style="background:#fbb;"
| 129 || August 28 || Rockies || 5–7 || || || || Shea Stadium || 45–84
|- style="background:#fbb;"
| 130 || August 29 || Rockies || 1–6 || || || – || Shea Stadium || 45–85
|- style="background:#cfc;"
| 131 || August 30 || Astros || 5–4 || || || || Shea Stadium || 46–85
|- style="background:#fbb;"
| 132 || August 31 || Astros || 2–10 || || || – || Shea Stadium || 46–86
|-

|- style="background:#fbb;"
| 133 || September 1 || Astros || 2–3 || || || || Shea Stadium || 46–87
|- style="background:#fbb;"
| 138 || September 6 || @ Astros || 2–7 || || || || Astrodome || 47–91
|- style="background:#fbb;"
| 139 || September 7 || @ Astros || 3–4  || || || – || Astrodome || 47–92
|- style="background:#fbb;"
| 140 || September 8 || @ Astros || 1–7 || || || – || Astrodome || 47–93
|-

|-

|- style="text-align:center;"
| Legend:       = Win       = Loss       = PostponementBold = Mets team member

Player stats

Batting

Starters by position 
Note: Pos = Position; G = Games played; AB = At bats; H = Hits; Avg. = Batting average; HR = Home runs; RBI = Runs batted in; OPS = OBP + SLG (On base + slugging percentage)

Other batters 
Note: G = Games played; AB = At bats; H = Hits; Avg. = Batting average; HR = Home runs; RBI = Runs batted in

Pitching

Starting pitchers 
Note: G = Games pitched; IP = Innings pitched; W = Wins; L = Losses; ERA = Earned run average; SO = Strikeouts

Other pitchers 
Note: G = Games pitched; IP = Innings pitched; W = Wins; L = Losses; ERA = Earned run average; SO = Strikeouts

Relief pitchers 
Note: G = Games pitched; W = Wins; L = Losses; SV = Saves; ERA = Earned run average; SO = Strikeouts

Farm system

References

External links
1993 New York Mets at Baseball Reference
1993 New York Mets team page at www.baseball-almanac.com

New York Mets seasons
New York Mets season
New York Mets
1990s in Queens